A Father Without Knowing It (French: Papa sans le savoir) is a 1932 French comedy film directed by Robert Wyler and starring Noël-Noël, Pierre Brasseur and Françoise Rosay.

Cast
 Noël-Noël as Léon Jacquet  
 Pierre Brasseur as Jean 
 Françoise Rosay as Madame Jacquet  
 Janine Merrey as Jeannine  
 Christiane Delyne as Madge  
 Lugné-Poe as L'oncle  
 Edmond Castel as Le marseillais  
 Émile Saint-Ober 
 Riri Bouché 
 Christiane Dor 
 Yvonne Yma 
 Suzanne Delvé as Madame Bertrand

See also
 The Little Accident (1930)
 Unexpected Father (1939)
 Casanova Brown (1944)
 Broadway comedy Little Accident (1928)

References

Bibliography 
 Crisp, Colin. Genre, Myth and Convention in the French Cinema, 1929-1939. Indiana University Press, 2002.

External links 
 

1932 films
1932 comedy films
French comedy films
1930s French-language films
Films directed by Robert Wyler
Films based on adaptations
Films based on American novels
French films based on plays
French black-and-white films
1930s French films